The Elon University Phoenix Men's Soccer team was founded in 1972 as a member of the NAIA, the team moved to NCAA Division II in 1989 and finally to NCAA Division I in 1999. The program is currently under the direction of head coach Marc Reeves.

Darren Powell led the Phoenix to a  .500 or better record in each of his 5 seasons at the helm. Elon Soccer won its first conference championship in 2008, the Southern Conference regular season. This was followed up in 2009 with the team's first appearance in the SoCon Championship game. the program has largely improved since its introduction to Division I in 1999. The team joined the Colonial Athletic Association on July 1st, 2014.

History

The 1970s: A program is born
Elon men's soccer played its inaugural season in the fall of 1972 with Charles Harris serving as the Fightin' Christians' first head coach. Elon competed in the NAIA as a member of the Carolinas Conference (CIAC). Faced with the challenge of building a program virtually from scratch, Coach Harris and the Fightin' Christians had mixed results. After debuting with a 2–1 victory over Greensboro College on October 13, 1972, the team would lose its last four games to finish the inaugural season with a 1–4 record. During the formative years of the program, Elon and Coach Harris struggled to find the winning formula. When Harris relinquished the reins following the 1977 season, Elon was still seeking its first winning-season in men's soccer. Though the record books may not remember the Charles Harris era very favorably (16-40-4 cumulative record in 6 seasons), he laid the foundation of a program for his successors to build upon.

A 6–6 (2–4 CIAC) record in 1976 stood as the best season in the brief history of Elon soccer as Steve Ballard took over as head coach in the Fall of 1978. Coach Ballard and the Fightin' Christians would need just two seasons to better that mark and subsequently take the program to the next level. The team struggled during Ballard's rookie year as head coach, finishing the year with a 2-11-1 (0–6 CIAC) record. The Fightin' Christians rebounded in 1979 to finish the decade with the first winning season in program history with an 8-6-2 (2-3-1 CIAC) record. Elon also qualified for the NAIA District 26 Playoffs that season, and though they were defeated by High Point 5-0, the 1979 team proved to those outside the program that Elon soccer had arrived.

Final Record (1972–1979): 26-57-7

The 1980s: Straight Outta Elon
The 1980s brought more "firsts" and continued growth for Elon soccer. The 1980 campaign marked the first winning season in CIAC play for the Fightin' Christians as the team went 6–1 in conference matches (8–8 overall). Following the CIAC success of 1980, Elon would have just one losing record in conference play (in 1986) until they left the CIAC following the 1988 season.

The winning ways of the 80s were not limited to CIAC matches. Elon made the NAIA District 26 Playoffs seven times from 1980 to 1988. This included the 1985 team, an offensive juggernaut, which went 13-3-1 (6-1-1 CIAC)and scored an incredible 57 goals. The team went on an 11-game unbeaten streak (a figure that is still tied for the Elon record), and amassed eight school records that stand to this day. These records include: goals scored (57), goals per match (3.35), assists (54), assists per match (3.18), points (168), points per match (9.88), shots (399), and shots per match (23.5). Even with all the offensive firepower, Elon fell 1—0 to High Point in the Playoffs. This marked the third time Elon had been defeated by High Point in the District 26 Playoffs since 1980. As that statistic would suggest, the Fightin' Christians found mostly heartbreak in the postseason during the 80s...until 1987.

The 1987 squad, under the direction of head coach Steve Ballard, still ranks as one of the best in Elon soccer history. Coming off a somewhat disappointing 1986 campaign, in which they finished 9-8-1 (3-4-1 CIAC)and lost to Guilford in PKs in the playoffs, the 1987 team was ready to prove that the previous year was a fluke. The 1987 Fightin' Christians went 16-3-1 (6-1-1 CIAC)and defeated High Point 1-0 to win the NAIA District 26 Championship. Despite losing 1–0 to West Virginia Wesleyan in the NAIA Area VII Tournament, the team still had one of the most outstanding seasons in program history. Their 16 victories, .825 win percentage, and 11 game winning/unbeaten streak are all still Elon records (or shared Elon records).

Elon's final year as a member of the NAIA in 1988 ended with the Fightin' Christians claiming another District 26 Championship and finishing with a record of 14-4-2 (4-2-2 CIAC). First-year head coach Rob Brewer, much like Ballard the year before, was winning with defense. The 1988 team still sets the Elon single season standard for goals against average (.75) and fewest goals allowed (12). They rode this prolific defense all the way to the second round of the NAIA Area VII Regional Tournament, where they ultimately fell to Alderson-Broaddus 3-0.

From a deadly offense in 1985 to stifling defense in 1987 and 1988, the teams of the mid 80s assaulted the record books and the competition. Ultimately, as the cliche goes, "defense wins championships," and Elon won its back to back District 26 Championships with solid defense. In fact, the 1987 and 1988 squads shared the record for most shutouts in a season (9) until 2009.

1988 signaled the end of an era for Elon soccer, as the school would transition to NCAA Division II and the South Atlantic Conference (SAC) in 1989.

Final Record (1980–1989): 103-61-14

The 1990s: Changes
Change was not initially kind to the Elon soccer program. The program's success of the late 1980s in the NAIA did not carry over into the 1990s in NCAA Division II.

Head coach Rob Brewer led the Fightin' Christians to winning seasons in 1992 and 1995 with final records of 10-5-2 (5–2) SAC and 9-8 (2–6 SAC), respectively. However, those would be the only two seasons in which the team finished with a .500 or better record.

In 1996, Mike Reilly took over as head coach in 1996 with a transition to NCAA Division I on the horizon. In terms of wins and losses, the Fightin' Christians transition was anything but smooth.

The team struggled in 1996, Reilly's first year at the helm, and the last season in Division II. After finishing the season winless, (0-13-2, 0-6-1 SAC) and setting a school record for saves made in a season with 248, the Fightin' Christians said goodbye to the SAC and Division II.

Elon now embarked on two NCAA-mandated transition years before it could become a fu l-member of Division I. The Fightin' Christians continued to struggle to find the win column, posting a combined record of 7-27-2 from 1997 to 1998.

The team went 3–14 (0–7 Big South) in 1999, the program's first season as a member of NCAA Division I and the Big South Conference. It showed that Elon soccer would have work to do in the years to come in order to compete for championships in Division I. Similar to its newly adopted mascot, the Phoenix, Elon soccer looked to "rise from the ashes" and emerge stronger than ever in the 2000s.

Final Record (1990–1999): 51-110-10

The Phoenix: A New Mascot for a New Millennium
As Elon College's varsity athletic teams made the transition to NCAA Division I and the College was preparing to become a university, a decision was made to change mascots as well. As of 1999–2000, The Fightin' Christians would now be known as the Phoenix.

A Phoenix is, of course, a bird of myth which burns at the end of its life and rises from the ashes "reborn and renewed, with strength forged in fire". The Phoenix holds a special symbolic connection with Elon University itself as well because the school almost completely burned down in 1923, only to "rise from the ashes" stronger than ever.

2000–2004: Trials by Fire
The Phoenix opened the new millennium with a .500 season (10-10, 3–4 Big South), but then followed it up with four consecutive losing seasons. The 2003 squad, despite going 6-11-1 overall, proved that the Phoenix could compete with anyone on a given night when they traveled to Columbia and defeated 25th-ranked South Carolina 1-0. That win marked the first victory by the Phoenix over a nationally ranked team since moving to Division I.

Head coach Mike Reilly, who had led the team through the transition to NCAA Division I, now led the team as it moved from the Big South Conference to the Southern Conference in 2003, where they remain to this day.

The first two seasons in the SoCon, 2003 and 2004, proved difficult for the Phoenix. The teams finished 1-5-1 in SoCon play both years, and after five seasons in Division I the Phoenix were still searching for a winning record(both overall and in-conference). But, true to their nickname, the Phoenix would eventually rise from the fires of transition.

2005–Present: Putting it all Together

Darren Powell arrived at Elon in 2005 looking to bring some of the success he had enjoyed as a player and assistant coach at UNC-Greensboro to Elon. As a player, Powell helped the Spartans to two NCAA Tournament berths in 1993 and 1994. Later, with Powell serving as an assistant coach, the Spartans posted a 55-26-3 record in Powell's four seasons on the bench. They also became the #1 team in the nation at one point in 2004. For his efforts, Powell was honored as one of the top NCAA Division I assistant coaches by College Soccer News. He looked to bring that winning attitude to Elon as head coach of the Phoenix.

Powell immediately began to turn things around for Elon soccer. The Phoenix finished 9-9-2 (4-2-1 SoCon) in 2005. This marked just the second non-losing season for the team since joining Division I. It was also the first winning record in conference play since moving to DI. Powell was honored as the Southern Conference Coach of the Year for  2005Coach Powell and the Phoenix were not content with the relative success of 2005. The 2006 squad kept the momentum going, and clinched Elon soccer's first winning season in Division I finishing 10-8-2 (3-3-1 SoCon). The team was also ranked as high as #22 in the Soccer America poll after a 6–1 start, which included a win over then-#17 UAB. The Phoenix continued to build in 2007 going 8-7-4 (4-3-0 SoCon)including a tie against top-ranked, and eventual national champion, Wake Forest. Elon soccer had learned what it took to compete at the highest level, but still had no "silverware" to show for it by the end of the 2007 season. That was about to change.

The 2008 Phoenix stumbled out of the gate 2-7-1 against a difficult non-conference schedule, but hit their stride as SoCon play began. Elon finished the regular season with a perfect 7-0-0 record in-conference (10-9-1 overall). The team entered the SoCon Tournament with dreams of securing the first NCAA Tournament bid in program history. After leading 1–0 at the half, the Phoenix fell-apart in the 2nd half allowing four goals to College of Charleston, and Elon's historic season ended with a disappointing 4–1 loss. Although the team fell short of its ultimate goal, the SoCon regular season championship was the first DI league title for Elon. Junior midfielder Justin Wyatt was named SoCon Player of the Year, and Coach Powell earned SoCon Coach of the Year honors for the second time. With all but three players returning, and a talented group of freshmen on their way, the Phoenix had high hopes for 2009.

Elon got off to a bit of a slow start once again in 2009, going 0-2-1 in their first three matches. But the Phoenix recovered to win six of the next eight, a stretch which included narrow 2-1 losses to nationally ranked ACC foes Wake Forest and Duke. The team also picked up just the second win over an ACC opponent since 1999 with a 2–0 defeat of Clemson. Matches against perennial powers from the ACC, West Virginia, and Charlotte (among others) are a part of Coach Powell's continued efforts to schedule tough non-conference matches that should challenge the team and help gauge where the team is at going into SoCon play.
The team finished 4-2-0 in a wide-open season in the Southern Conference. Elon ultimately finished second, behind Wofford, in the final regular season standings. With a record of 9-7-2 heading into the SoCon Tournament, the Phoenix would likely have to win in order to secure a berth in the NCAA Tournament. A 2–0 win over College of Charleston set up a showdown with Wofford for the title. The Terriers, playing on their home field as the #1 seed, jumped out to a 2–0 lead before the Phoenix were able to get one back. Wofford was able to hold on and took the game, SoCon title, and automatic berth in the NCAA Tournament with a 2–1 victory.

Although the 2010 team will have to replace seven seniors, the Phoenix will once again look to finish at the top of the table in the SoCon. A talented group of freshmen  will join the returning players to continue chasing a Southern Conference championship, and the NCAA Tournament bid that has continued to elude them.

Final Record (2000–2010): 90-104-23

Elon Soccer All-Time (1972–Present): 270-332-54 (.412)

Elon Soccer in the MLS
The SoCon has a rich soccer tradition, having produced players such as US Internationals Clint Dempsey and Ricardo Clark, which the Phoenix hope to help continue. One soccer writer, while comparing each of the NCAA soccer conferences to a European professional league, compared the SoCon to Super League Greece stating: "Watch the league, you will see good players. Just no one outside the conference will believe that until they make (the) big stage".

Elon, individually, has also seen many talented players come through the program, but few have gotten the opportunity to prove it on the big stage. One former Phoenix defensive standout is out to help change that.

Elon's Steven Kinney hopes to follow in the tradition of SoCon legends like Dempsey and Clark by making his mark as a professional. Kinney was selected by the Chicago Fire with the 45th Overall Pick in the third round of the 2010 MLS SuperDraft. After graduating from Elon University in December 2009, he became Elon's first player to sign for an MLS Club. Said Fire Technical Director Frank Klopas: "Steven Kinney has proven himself during the preseason to have the passion and talent we need on the pitch as we rebuild our defense [...] we're happy to have him now as part of the Fire family."

A native of Norcross, Georgia, Kinney started in 78 games for the Phoenix, and he was named first-team All-Southern Conference three times. During his four seasons at Elon, he anchored a defense that kept 28 clean sheets, including a school record 10 in 2009. Kinney was also the first Elon men's soccer player to earn Academic All-America status, being named to the ESPN The Magazine Academic All-America third team in November.

"I am truly blessed and honored to have this opportunity to continue my playing career," Kinney commented. "I have to give a large thanks to the Elon soccer family for helping me reach the goal of playing at this level."

In 2012, two more Phoenix Alumni signed MLS Contracts. 2010 Graduate Clint Irwin signed for the Colorado Rapids, and 2012 Graduate Gabe Latigue signed for the New England Revolution of the MLS in 2012.

Individual awards and honors

All-Conference
Carolina's Conference

1973: Don Carlson, Peter Charles

1974: Don Carlson, Steve Moline, Don Ritter, Steve Rutledge, Robert Tucker

1975: Joe Curtis

1976: Greg Hamilon

1978: Kevin McCallie, Mike Curtis

1979: George Bakatsias, Kevin McCallie

1980: Kevin McCallie, Marash Nikaj, Jeff Sheilds

1981: Chip Calloway (Honorable Mention), Joe Chisolhm (HM), Kevin McCallie (HM), Jeff Sheilds

1982: Jeff Sheilds, Scott Spada

1983: Joe Bartlinski, Israel Hernandez, Paul Lawson, Andy Schaefer, Scott Spada

1984: Joe Bartlinski (HM), Paul Lawson, Joe Nepay, Andy Schaefer (HM), Anthony Sherwood (HM)

1985: Glen Gess, Joe Nepay, Andy Schaefer, Mike Wessels

1987: Glen Gees (2nd Team), Kip Rackley (2nd Team), Kevin Thomas (2nd Team), Mike Wessels (2nd Team)

1988: Marcus Ford (2nd Team), Glen Gess, R.T. Thomas, Mike Wessels

South Atlantic Conference

1989: Jeff Cabot (2nd Team), Mike Crabtree (2nd Team), R.T. Myers (2nd Team), Marcus Ford (1st Team)

1990: Mike Crabtree (1st Team), Marcus Ford

1991: Mike Crabtree (1st Team), Dave Myers (2nd Team)

1992: Mike Crabtree, Dave Myers (2nd Team), Steve Roark (1st Team)

1993: Chad Lorentz (2nd Team), Dave Myers (1st Team)

1994: Bob Artioli (2nd Team)

1995: Bob Artioli (1st Team), Asi Johnson (2nd Team)

Big South Conference

2000: Chad Heinicke (2nd Team), Jake Downs (2nd Team)

2001: Robert Latimer (2nd Team), Devin McCarron (2nd Team)

2002: Paul Bellachqua (2nd Team), Chad Heinicke

Southern Conference

2003: Brent McDowell (2nd Team)

2004: Douglas Boateng (2nd Team), Junior Nombre (2nd Team)

2005: Junior Nombre (1st Team), Brett Paschall (2nd Team), Taylor Saxe (2nd Team), Kiki Willis (1st Team)

2006: Nick Aparicio (2nd Team), Junior Nombre (2nd Team), Taylor Saxe, Kiki Willis

2007: Clint Irwin (2nd Team), Steven Kinney (1st Team), Brett Paschall (1st Team), Justin Wyatt (1st Team)

2008: Kyle Boerner (1st Team), James Carroll (Freshman Team), Clint Collins (2nd Team), Erfan Imeni (1st Team), Clint Irwin (2nd Team), Steven Kinney (1st Team), Will Mason (2nd Team), Aaron Parker (2nd Team), Justin Wyatt (1st Team)

2009: Brad Franks (2nd Team), Clint Irwin (1st Team), Erfan Imeni (1st Team), Steven Kinney (1st Team), Chris Thomas (2nd Team/Freshman Team), Justin Wyatt (1st Team)

2010: Nick Butterly (Freshman Team), Brad Franks (1st Team), Clint Irwin (1st Team), Austen King (1st Team), Daniel Lovitz (Freshman Team), Chris Thomas (1st Team)

2011: Nick Millington (2nd Team), Austin Dunker (Freshman Team)

2012: Chris Thomas (1st Team), Matt Wescoe (2nd Team), Samuel McBride (Freshman Team), Miguel Salazar (Freshman Team)

Coach of the Year
1979– Steve Ballard (District)

1984– Steve Ballard (Carolinas Conference and District)

2005– Darren Powell (SoCon)

2008– Darren Powell (SoCon)

2012– Darren Powell (SoCon)

Player of the Year
1984– Joe Nepay (CIAC)

1993– Dave Myers (SAC)

2008– Justin Wyatt (SoCon)

2010– Chris Thomas (SoCon)

2012– Chris Thomas (SoCon)

Freshman of the Year
1988– Marcus Ford (CIAC)

1992– Steve Roark (SAC)

1995– Asi Johnson (SAC)

2005– Kiki Willis (SoCon)

2009– Chris Thomas (SoCon)

All-South Region
1983– Scott Spada

1985– Joe Nepay, Andy Scheafer

1986– Mike Wessels

1987– Mike Wessels

1988– Mike Wessels

1990– Marcus Ford

1991-Mike Crabtree

1992– Mike Crabtree, Dave Myers, Steve Roark

1993– Dave Myers (2nd Team)

1995– Asi Johnson (2nd Team)

2005– Taylor Saxe (3rd Team), Kiki Willis (2nd Team)

2007– Steven Kinney (2nd Team), Justin Wyatt (2nd Team)

2008– Erfan Imeni (3rd Team), Steven Kinney (2nd Team), Justin Wyatt (2nd Team)

2009– Clint Irwin (1st Team), Steven Kinney (2nd Team)

2010– Clint Irwin (2nd Team), Chris Thomas (1st Team)

2012– Chris Thomas (1st Team), Gabe Latigue (2nd Team), Daniel Lovitz (3rd Team)

All-Americans
1983– Scott Spada

1984– Joe Nepay

1985– Joe Nepay, Andy Schaefer

1988– Glen Gess (HM)

1993– Dave Myers (HM)

2012 – Chris Thomas

NSCAA Scholar All-Americans
2008– Steven Kinney (2nd Team)

2009– Clint Irwin (2nd Team), Steven Kinney (2nd Team)

2010– Clint Irwin (2nd Team)

All-Time Results

Notes

External links
 

 
1972 establishments in North Carolina
Association football clubs established in 1972